The 1930 Stanley Cup Finals was played between the Boston Bruins and the Montreal Canadiens. In a best of three series, Montreal won 4–3 and 3–0 to win the team's third Stanley Cup title.

Paths to the Finals
The defending champion Boston Bruins had an outstanding season. Their final record of 38–5–1 translates to an .875 winning percentage, the best in NHL history. The team did not lose two games in a row all season, until being swept by the Canadiens. This prompted the change for the following year in the Finals format to a best-of-five format.

Game summaries
The Finals was a best-of-three series. The Canadiens had lost all four of their regular-season meetings with the Bruins. Captain Sylvio Mantha was the leader, scoring in both final games.

Game one saw the Bruins play way below their usual form and George Hainsworth picked up a shutout. In game two, Howie Morenz scored what proved to be the winning goal at 17:50 of the second
period and the Canadiens won the Stanley Cup. It was the first time all year that the Bruins lost two games in a row.

Stanley Cup engraving
The 1930 Stanley Cup was presented to Canadiens captain Sylvio Mantha by NHL President Frank Calder following the Canadiens 4–3 win over the Bruins in game two.

The following Canadiens players and staff had their names engraved on the Stanley Cup

1929–30 Montreal Canadiens

See also
1929–30 NHL season

References

 Podnieks, Andrew; Hockey Hall of Fame (2004). Lord Stanley's Cup. Triumph Books, 12, 57. .

Stanley Cup
Stanley Cup Finals
Boston Bruins games
Montreal Canadiens games
Stanley Cup Finals
Ice hockey competitions in Boston
1930s in Boston
Stanley Cup Finals
Stanley Cup Finals
Ice hockey competitions in Montreal
1930s in Montreal
Boston Garden